The 2003 Syracuse Orangemen football team represented  Syracuse University during the 2003 NCAA Division I-A football season. The Orangemen were coached by Paul Pasqualoni and played their home games at the Carrier Dome in Syracuse, New York. The Orangemen posted a two-win improvement over the previous season.

This was the last season in which Syracuse used the "Orangemen" nickname. Beginning with the 2004–05 school year, the school adopted its current nickname of Orange.

Schedule

Roster

References

Syracuse
Syracuse Orange football seasons
Syracuse Orangemen football